Mary Josephine Capone ( Coughlin; April 11, 1897 – April 16, 1986) was the Irish-American wife of gangster Al Capone.

Early life 
Mary "Mae" Josephine Coughlin was born in Brooklyn, New York, to Bridget Gorman and Michael (Mike) Coughlin on April 11, 1897. Her parents immigrated to the U.S. from Ireland separately in the 1890s. Michael was a laborer, Bridget did housework. They met in New York and were married. They had six children, Anna, Mary, Dennis, Catherine, Agnes, and Walter. She attended school until she started working as a sales clerk.

Family life

Marriage and family 
Mae Coughlin married Alphonse Capone on December 30, 1918, at the St. Mary Star of the Sea Church in Brooklyn, New York. They either met at a party in the Carroll Gardens neighborhood of Brooklyn, or their marriage was arranged by Al's mother, who knew Mae from church. Mae was two years older than her husband. On their marriage certificate, Al increased his age by one year, and Mae decreased her age by two years, making them both appear 20 years old. Despite the rivalry between Italian-American and Irish-American groups at the time, there is no evidence that Capone's parents opposed their marriage. It is speculated that Al's parents were probably in favor of the union, because an Irish partner was seen as higher status than an Italian at the time. In addition to their differences in ethnicity, Mae was also more educated, more Catholic, and more middle class, while her husband was less educated, and grew up in a rougher part of town. Mae Capone remained a devoted Catholic throughout her entire life.

Three weeks before their wedding, Mae reportedly gave birth to a son, Albert Francis "Sonny" Capone. The couple had no more children. As reported by Deirdre Capone, a great-niece of Al Capone (the granddaughter of Ralph Capone), this was because Capone was sterile due to a birth defect. Other sources claim that she contracted syphilis from Al, which caused each subsequent try for another child to end in miscarriage or stillbirth. 

From a young age, Sonny showed signs of being hard of hearing. This supposedly was because Mae had transmitted syphilis to him as well. When Sonny developed a mastoid ear infection, Al and Mae Capone traveled from Chicago to New York to ensure he got the best care. She also filed a lawsuit when her grandchildren were being bullied in school for being a Capone, following the release of the TV series, The Untouchables.

Involvement in Al's gang life 
Capone was not involved in Al's racketeering business, although she was affected by the actions Al took in dating other women while they were married. She once told her son "not to do what your father did. He broke my heart." Her hair also started to gray when she was 28, presumably due to stress regarding her husband's situation. Al was ultimately sentenced to 11 years of imprisonment on October 24, 1931, and Mae was one of three people allowed to visit him in prison. The other two were Al's mother and son. Mae remained a devoted wife, frequently sending letters to her husband, referring to him as "honey", and expressing her longing for him to return home. She visited him in person as well, traveling up to 3,000 miles from the Capones' Florida home to Alcatraz, usually going to lengths to obscure her face in order to avoid the paparazzi. From Al's imprisonment up until his death, Mae, along with Al's brothers and sisters, was in charge of his affairs: possessions, titles, and belongings.

Al was finally released from prison and arrived at the Capones' Florida home on March 22, 1940. Mae was Al's primary caretaker following his release from prison. He died January 25, 1947, in their Miami home. He was buried in a Catholic cemetery in Hillside, Illinois. Mae was distraught following his death, and remained out of the public spotlight thereafter.

Financial well-being 

Al's racketeering business provided well for the family. Somewhere in the years between 1920–1921, he bought a home in Chicago that housed Mae and Sonny, as well as members of the Capone family. Mae and Sonny did not make the move from Brooklyn to Chicago to join Al until 1923. He also bought a second home for his family in Palm Isle, Florida. Mae had the liberty to decorate the home lavishly. The family owned several cars: a couple of Lincolns and a custom-designed cabriolet (similar to a Cadillac) that Mae herself drove. They lived comfortably, and had enough money to pay off bill collectors when their bills were overdue. When Capone's Palm Island home was burgled, an estimated $300,000 worth of Mae's jewelry was stolen.

Legal issues

Lawsuits 
In 1936 the federal government filed a tax lien of $51,498.08 on the Capones' Miami estate. Having purchased the estate under Mae's name, and Al being in jail, Mae was left to deal with the lien. She paid it. In 1937, she filed a lawsuit against J. Edwin Larsen, the collector for the Internal Revenue Service, on claims that the tax lien money had been collected illegally. Her request for a refund of $52,103.30 was denied.

In 1959, Desilu Productions released a two-part series called The Untouchables. The series was about Prohibition agents fighting crime. In 1960, Capone, her son, and Al's sister, Mafalda Maritote, sued Desilu Productions, Inc., Columbia Broadcasting System and Westinghouse Electric Corporation, for $6 million in damages. They claimed the series infringed on their privacy and had caused them humiliation and shame. Sonny Capone claimed that his children had been made fun of in school, so much that he was forced to pick up and move his family to another city. The federal District Court and Chicago Circuit Court rejected the suit. When the plaintiffs appealed to the U.S. Supreme Court, their appeal was rejected as well, on the basis that privacy rights are personal and do not extend to next of kin.

Death 
Capone died on April 16, 1986, at the age of 89, at a nursing home in Hollywood, Florida. She was buried in Florida.

Political background and context

Mae Capone and Prohibition 
During Prohibition, there was controversy among women concerning the 18th amendment. Organizations such as the Woman's Christian Temperance Union (WCTU) supported the 18th Amendment and fought to uphold it. This organization was viewed as being representative of all women and many assumed that women would stand united on this subject. However, this notion fell apart with the rise of The Women's Organization for National Prohibition Reform (WONPR). Both groups were centered around the protection of the home but had radically different opinions on how that could be accomplished. While the WCTU believed that the home needed to be protected from the influences of alcohol, the WONPR protested against the cultural effects of Prohibition. They saw the amendment as the cause of the increased crime and an attitude of resentment for the law.

Though many believed that the 19th Amendment allowing women to vote would be the sustaining power behind the 18th Amendment, women were a highly influential force in overturning it. During all this political unrest, Capone remained quiet. Despite being married to one of the biggest names in bootlegging, she did not voice an opinion on Prohibition. She certainly benefited from the amendment, as it created the demand for her husband's line of work, but never publicly took a stand on her feelings about the matter. Her experience may be reflected in the stories of other mothers of the era. Pauline Sabin, founder of the WONPR, stated that many of the members of the organization fought for reform because "they don't want their babies to grow up in the hip-flask, speakeasy atmosphere that has polluted their own youth. As far as exposure to this hip-flask culture, few were more exposed to it than Mae. Evidence suggests that she was concerned about the effect it might have on her son. It is reported that she actively discouraged her son Albert from following in his father's footsteps.

Mae Capone in the public sector 
Many women during this era took the opportunity to step out of anonymity and take the public spotlight. Pauline Morton Sabin was a good example of this. She wasn't politically active when it came to fighting for women's suffrage, but once it was granted she took full advantage of it. She became a vocal advocate for prohibition reform and helped create the Women's Organization for National Prohibition Reform. On the other side of the issue we have Ella Boole, the president of WCTU. She was a bold political activist and even went so far as to tell congress that she "Spoke for all women!" Mrs. Sabin was quick to refute this as were many others. While many women during this time took the opportunity to be more vocal, Mae sought anonymity and shelter from the press. Even when other gangsters' wives were coming out and writing books about their experiences regarding being married to mob members, Capone did not write or publish anything for the public to read. While other women fought to end prohibition, she fought for privacy.

In popular culture 
 Josh Humphrey wrote a poem titled, "A Poem about Al Capone's Wife". The poem is written from Mae's point of view. It captures both the heartache and feelings of devotion she might have experienced.
 Mae was portrayed by Marcella Lentz-Pope on Boardwalk Empire and Linda Cardellini in the 2020 biographical film Capone.

References 

Al Capone
1897 births
1986 deaths
People from Brooklyn
American people of Irish descent